Ophichthus arneutes is an eel in the family Ophichthidae. It was described by John E. McCosker and Richard Heinrich Rosenblatt in 1998. It is a marine, deep water-dwelling eel which is known from the Galapagos Islands, in the southeastern Pacific Ocean.

The specific epithet arneutes means "diver" in Greek, and refers simultaneously to the depth at which the species is found, and to the method of capture.

References

Taxa named by John E. McCosker
Taxa named by Richard Heinrich Rosenblatt
Fish described in 1998
arneutes
Fish of the Pacific Ocean